Robert Daniels (born August 30, 1968) is an American former professional boxer who competed from 1984 to 2007, with a comeback in 2012. He held the WBA cruiserweight title from 1989 to 1991.

Professional career
Daniels turned pro in 1984 and in 1989 he captured the vacant WBA cruiserweight title by defeating a badly faded 36-year-old Dwight Muhammad Qawi in France. He defended the title twice before losing the title to Bobby Czyz in 1991 in a close split decision in Atlantic City. He continued to fight as both a cruiserweight and heavyweight through 1997. In his highest profile fights as a heavyweight, he lost to Lawrence Clay-Bey and David Tua.

Robert Daniels was managed by Michael Frost, the boxing manager and former marketing agent for Gary Sheffield, Jeff Conine, Robb Nenn, Bret Barberie, and others.

Professional boxing record

See also
 List of cruiserweight boxing champions

External links

1968 births
Living people
Cruiserweight boxers
Heavyweight boxers
World cruiserweight boxing champions
World Boxing Association champions
International Boxing Organization champions
People from Hialeah, Florida
Boxers from Florida
American male boxers